Pedro Herrera may refer to:

Pedro María Herrera, Spanish footballer
Chingo Bling, American rapper, birth name Pedro Herrera III
Pedro de Herrera, Spanish politician